Reto Gribi (born 5 February 1991) is a Swiss curler.

Teams

Men's

Mixed

Mixed doubles

Personal life
His sister Michelle is also a curler and Reto's mixed doubles teammate. They won the  together.

References

External links
 

Living people
1991 births
Swiss male curlers
World mixed doubles curling champions
Swiss curling champions
Place of birth missing (living people)